The Mountain Lake Estates Historic District is a U.S. historic district (designated as such on August 26, 1993), located north of Lake Wales, Florida, off the FL 17 (formerly US 27A) Scenic Highway.

Mountain Lake Estates was first developed in the 1920s as an exclusive residential area created "to attract the nation's business elite".  The developers hired Frederick Law Olmsted, Jr. to design the community.  Such wealthy and widely known people as Edward W. Bok (long-time editor of Ladies' Home Journal and Pulitzer-Prize-winning author), August Heckscher (benefactor of the Heckscher Museum of Art), and Irving T. Bush (of Bush Terminal, Bush Tower, and Bush House fame) subsequently became early "snowbirds" and established winter homes in or near Mountain Lake Estates.

The district contains 65 historic buildings, including two previously listed on the National Register: El Retiro Estate (today renamed "Pinewood" and part of the landmark Bok Tower Gardens) and Mountain Lake Colony House. Noted architect Wallace Neff, known for his celebrity clients' mansions in southern California (see for example Pickfair), designed one home within Mountain Lakes Estates, one of his few commissions outside California.

Mission Revival, Colonial Revival, and other "revival" styles of architecture are most common. House lots  within the historic district can be sizable; as an example, Irving T. Bush's estate covered five acres (about 2 hectares).

References

External links
 Polk County listings at National Register of Historic Places
 Polk County listings at Florida's Office of Cultural and Historical Programs

Lake Wales, Florida
National Register of Historic Places in Polk County, Florida
Historic districts on the National Register of Historic Places in Florida